Zoë Gameau (nee Tuckwell-Smith) is an Australian actress. She is best known for her role as Bec Gilbert on the Australian television show Winners & Losers.

Early life
Zoë Gameau was born in Sydney. Shortly after, her parents returned to Bangladesh where they were working at the time. Tuckwell-Smith's parents divorced when she was five years old and she was raised by her mother in Sydney. Tuckwell-Smith visited her father during her school holidays. Tuckwell-Smith enjoyed acting from a young age and said "I've always been a dreamer – imaginative and creative. As a child I loved putting on plays and making up stories to perform for my parents or my toys!." After finishing high school, Tuckwell-Smith was accepted into the National Institute of Dramatic Art (NIDA) and graduated three years later.

Career
In 2004, Gameau appeared in Six Pack, All Saints and The Cooks. She went on to appear in Home and Away and In Search of Paradise. Tuckwell-Smith was cast in Stupid Stupid Man in 2007. The following year, the actress made appearances in The Cut and The Strip.

As well as television, Gameau has appeared in various feature films, including Son of the Mask (2004), Gone (2005), Cactus (2008) and Primal (2010). In 2010, Tuckwell-Smith also guested in Short Stack's video clip for "Planets".

In 2011, Gemeau joined the cast of Winners & Losers in the leading role of Rebecca "Bec" Gilbert. She relocated to Melbourne from Sydney for filming.

Personal life
Tuckwell-Smith began dating actor Damon Gameau in 2009, after the couple were introduced to each other by fellow actor Gyton Grantley, while they were both in East Timor. Tuckwell-Smith and Gameau announced that they were expecting their first child in June 2013, and Tuckwell-Smith gave birth to the couple's daughter, Velvet Gameau, in November 2013. Tuckwell-Smith and Gameau married in January 2016.

Filmography

References

External links 

Actresses from Sydney
Living people
National Institute of Dramatic Art alumni
Australian television actresses
Australian film actresses
Year of birth missing (living people)